The .256 Newton was a high-velocity, rimless centerfire cartridge based on the .30-06 Springfield military cartridge and developed in 1913 by Charles Newton in conjunction with the Western Cartridge Company. To make the .256 Newton cartridge, the .30-06 case was necked down to a caliber of .264 inches, the overall case length was shortened, body taper was increased, the neck was moved back, and the shoulder was given a sharper, 23-degree angle, as opposed to the 17-degree shoulder of the parent cartridge. 

The .256 Newton suffered from a lack of available slow-burning powders capable of fully exploiting the large capacity of the parent case. Newton's company went bankrupt after the end of World War I and production of commercially loaded ammunition ceased by 1938.

After World War II, with a supply of 6.5mm rifles (.264 caliber), the availability of slower burning powders, and inexpensive, surplus .30-06 brass cases, shooters developed the 6.5mm-06 wildcat cartridge by necking down the .30-06 case to 6.5mm (.264 inches). In 1997, the A-Square company standardized the chambering as the 6.5-06 A-Square with the Sporting Arms and Ammunition Manufacturers' Institute (SAAMI). Although substantially similar, the .256 Newton is not interchangeable with the .30-06 parent cartridge, the 6.5-06 wildcat chambering, or the SAAMI standardized 6.5-06 A-Square cartridge.

References

External links
 Information from the Reloaders Nest
 An online discussion archive on the .256 Newton

Newton rifle cartridges
Pistol and rifle cartridges